Thomas Carl Benson (born June 9, 1961) is a former American football linebacker in the National Football League. He played college football at the University of Oklahoma. He played nine seasons in the NFL for four teams.

1961 births
Living people
American football linebackers
Atlanta Falcons players
Los Angeles Raiders players
New England Patriots players
Oklahoma Sooners football players
People from Ardmore, Oklahoma
San Diego Chargers players